"China's final warning" is a Russian proverb that originated as a Soviet political joke in the Soviet Union in the 1950s, referring to a warning that carries no real consequences.

Origin 
Relations between the People's Republic of China and the United States during the 1950s and 1960s were strained due to the Taiwan Strait issues. American military fighter jets regularly patrolled the Taiwan Strait, which led to formal protests being regularly lodged by the Chinese Communist Party in the form of a "final warning", for their fighter maneuvers in the strait. However, no real consequences were given for ignoring the "final warnings".

The People's Republic of China released its first "final warning" to the United States for their reconnaissance flights on 7 September 1958, during the Second Taiwan Strait Crisis. At the time, the United States considered the Republic of China as the sole legitimate representative of China and conducted reconnaissance flights in waters controlled by the People's Republic of China. China would then record such incidents, and issue a "final warning" through diplomatic channels for each incident that occurred. More than 900 Chinese "final warnings" had been issued by the end of 1964. During the Taiwan Straits Conflicts from 14 March 1950 to 13 January 1967, at least one United States Air Force aircraft and 37 Republic of China Air Force aircraft were shot down by People's Liberation Army Air Force, People's Liberation Army Naval Air Force, and PLA anti-aircraft units.

Modern usage 
Following the dissolution of the Soviet Union, the proverb has retained its use as a common metaphorical catchphrase within the post-Soviet countries, especially in Estonia.

The term was popularized in English-language social media during the lead-up to Nancy Pelosi's 2022 visit to Taiwan to refer to China's threats which are said to be superficially strong, but actually weak.

See also 
 Hurting the feelings of the Chinese people
 Paper tiger
 The Boy Who Cried Wolf
 Ultimatum

References 

Popular culture language
Proverbs
Russian proverbs
China–Russia relations
Foreign relations of China